Guiseppe du Toit (born 29 July 1995) is a Canadian rugby union player who generally plays as a centre for the  Toronto Arrows in Major League Rugby (MLR). He also represents Canada internationally. 

On 27 September 2019, he was included in the Canadian squad for the 2019 Rugby World Cup as an injury replacement to Nick Blevins and also marked his first World Cup appearance.

Career 
He made his international debut for Canada against Chile on 11 February 2017. He received his maiden World Cup call for the 2019 World Cup while he was pursuing his studies at the University of Victoria and made his debut World Cup match appearance against South Africa on 5 October 2019.

References 

1995 births
Living people
Canadian rugby union players
Canada international rugby union players
Rugby union centres
University of Victoria alumni
BC Bears players
Toronto Arrows players